Vadim Kurlovich (born 30 October 1992) is a Belarusian professional football player who plays for Naftan Novopolotsk.

Honours
BATE Borisov
Belarusian Premier League champion: 2010, 2011, 2012

External links
 
 
 Profile at BATE website

1992 births
Living people
Belarusian footballers
Association football midfielders
FC BATE Borisov players
FC Vitebsk players
FC Dynamo Brest players
FC Slutsk players
FC Granit Mikashevichi players
FC Slavia Mozyr players
FC Sputnik Rechitsa players
FC Shakhtyor Petrikov players
FC Naftan Novopolotsk players